There is a recurrent presence of homoerotic poems in Hispano-Arabic poetry. Erotic literature, often of the highest quality, flourished in Islamic culture at a time when homosexuality, introduced as a cultural refinement in Umayyad culture, played an important role.

Among the Andalusian kings the practice of homosexuality with young men was quite common; among them, Abbot Al-Mu'tamid of Seville and Yusuf III of the Nasrid kingdom of Granada wrote homoerotic poetry. The preference for Christian male and female slaves over women or ephebes of their own culture contributed to the hostility of the Christian kingdoms. Also among the Jewish community of al-Andalus homosexuality was even normal among the aristocracy.

The contradiction between the condemnatory religious legality and the permissive popular reality was overcome by resorting to a neoplatonic sublimation, the "udri love", of an ambiguous chastity. The object of desire, generally a servant, slave or captive, inverted the social role in poetry, becoming the owner of the lover, in the same way as happened with courtly love in medieval Christian Europe.

The homoeroticism present in Andalusian poetry establishes a type of relationship similar to that described in ancient Greece: the adult poet assumes an active (top) role against an ephebe who assumes the passive (bottom) one, which came to produce a literary cliché, that of the appearance of the "bozo", which allows, given the descriptive ambiguity of the poems, both in images and grammatical uses, to identify the sex of the lover described. Much of the erotic-amorous poetry of the period is devoted to the cupbearer or wine pourer, combining the bacchic (خمريات jamriyyat) and homoerotic (مذكرات mudhakkarat) genres.

It began to flourish in the first half of the 9th century, during the reign of Abderraman II, emir of Córdoba. The fall of the Caliphate of Córdoba in the eleventh century and the subsequent rule of the Almoravids and the division into the Taifa kingdoms, decentralized culture throughout al-Andalus, producing an era of splendor in poetry. The Almohad invasion brought the emergence of new literary courts in the 12th and 13th centuries. The greater female autonomy in this North African ethnic group led to the appearance of a greater number of female poets, some of whom also wrote poems that sang of feminine beauty.

Context 
The civilization developed in the Umayyad Caliphate from Córdoba rivaled and even surpassed that of Christian Europe. After the death of Charlemagne in 814 and the subsequent decline of his Empire, the only city that rivaled Córdoba in Europe was Constantinople, capital of the Byzantine Empire and located at the other end of the continent. The caliphs of Córdoba surpassed their Byzantine contemporaries in culture. Literature, especially poetry, was enthusiastically cultivated, as was the case in all Arab countries; during the period, Arabic came to surpass Latin as a language in works on medicine, astronomy and mathematics; Christians on the peninsula learned Arabic to perfect an expressive and elegant style, and scholars from all over Christian Europe traveled to Toledo or Córdoba for their studies. It is likely that they maintained a superior standard of public administration: many of the Christian and Jewish subjects preferred the rule of the infidels, whose legislation was no more intolerant than Christian laws.

After the Arab conquest in 711 there was a unique flowering in the Iberian peninsula of homoerotic poetry, which repeated a phenomenon of the Islamic world in general, with parallels in the erotic lyric poetry of Iraq, Persia, Afghanistan, India, Turkeym and North African countries such as Egypt, Tunisia, and Morocco. Anthologies of medieval Islamic poetry from the great Arab capitals show, over almost a millennium, the same current of passionate homoeroticism found in the poems of Córdoba, Seville or Granada.

Homosexuality, consented to on the basis of a general Koranic tolerance towards sins of the flesh, was introduced as a cultural refinement among the Umayyads, despite the protests of some juridical schools. Thus, Ibn Hazm of Córdoba was tolerant of homoeroticism, showing his reprobation only when it was mixed with some kind of public immorality, an attitude apparently shared by his contemporaries.

Both philosophically and literarily, Greek classicism was known and respected by the Andalusian authors, whose work of translation and compilation was essential in the survival of many classical texts. Many of the themes of Andalusian poetry, such as the praise of ephebic beauty, are directly derived from Greek homoerotic poetry, which they knew through translations from the time of the great library of the Córdoba of the Umayyad caliph Hisham II.

Islamic law and homosexuality 

The severity and intolerance that characterized traditional Judaism and Christianity in sexual matters reappeared in the laws of the third Abrahamic religion. Regarding homosexuality, some important schools, such as that of the theologian Malik of Medina or the literalist Ibn Hanbal, contemplated the death penalty, generally by stoning. Other more liberal schools of law reduced the punishment to flogging, generally one hundred lashes.

However, other aspects of Islamic culture show some contradiction with the severity, inherited from the Old Testament, which dominated the legality of Islam in this respect. The popular attitude was much less hostile to homoeroticism and European visitors were surprised at the relaxed tolerance of homoeroticism among Arabs, who seemed to find nothing unnatural in relations between men and boys. In medieval Arab treatises on love, this so-called "emotional intoxication" is provoked not only by the love of women, but also by the love of boys and other men. While in the rest of Europe it was punishable by burning at the stake, in al-Andalus homosexuality was common and intellectually prestigious; the work of authors such as Ibn Sahl of Seville, explicit in this sense, was carried to all corners of the Islamic world as an example of love poetry.

Ibn Hazm's only mention of lesbianism in The Ring of the Dove is, in application of Islam, damning. But Arabic references to lesbianism are not so apparently condemnatory: at least a dozen romances between women are mentioned in The Book of Hind, herself an archetypal lesbian; a 9th century Treatise on lesbianism (Kitab al-Sahhakat) has been lost, and later works on Arab eroticism contained chapters on this subject. Some women in al-Andalus had access to education and were able to write freely. In their poems, love for another woman is treated and present in the same way as that of male poets for other men.

The Australian historian Robert Aldrich points out that in part this tolerance towards homoeroticism is due to the fact that Islam does not recognize such a marked separation between the flesh and the spirit as Christianity does and has an appreciation for sexual pleasure. Other reasons would be aesthetic: in the Koran it is a man, Yūsuf (the Christian patriarch Joseph), who in surah XII is presented as the maximum representative of beauty. In this Koranic text, the Platonic concept that beauty is what generates love, in a terrible, rapturous way, is also shown. García Gómez points out in his introduction to The Ring of the Dove that Muslims call "al-iftitān bi-l-suwar" the "disorder or commotion that souls suffer when contemplating beauty concretized in harmonious forms," illustrating it with the story of the Egyptian noblewomen who cut their fingers while peeling oranges, snatched by the beauty of Yūsuf.

Among the Andalusian kings the practice of homosexuality with young men was quite common; Abderraman III, Alhaken II (who had offspring for the first time at the age of 46, with a Christian Basque slave girl who cross-dressed, in the fashion of Baghdad, as if she were an ephebus), Abd Allah of the Taifa of Granada, the Nasrid Muhammed VI; among them, the abbot Al-Mu'tamid of the Taifa of Seville and Yusuf III of the Nasrid Kingdom of Granada wrote homoerotic poetry; Abderraman III, Alhaken II, Hisham II and Al-Mu'tamid openly maintained male harems. It is known that the Hispano-Arabs preferred Christian slaves as sexual partners to women or ephebes of their own culture, which provoked the enmity and continuous hostilities of the Christian kingdoms. The martyrdom of the Christian child Pelagius for resisting the wishes of Abderraman III, first Umayyad caliph of Córdoba, for which he was later sanctified, is well known.

Also among the Jewish community of al-Andalus homosexuality was even normal among the aristocracy. To quote from the collective volume Aspects of Jewish Culture in the Middle Ages (1979), in Spain there was "a courtly and aristocratic culture characterized by a romantic individualism (in which there was) an intense exploration of all forms of liberatory sexuality: heterosexuality, bisexuality, homosexuality". Homosexual pleasure was not only frequent, but was considered more refined among the well-to-do and educated; apparently, there is data indicating that Sevillian prostitutes in the early 12th century were paid more than their female counterparts, and had a higher class clientele. Prostitutes were relegated to the urban plebs and especially to the peasants who visited the cities.

Homoeroticism in Andalusian Literature 
To overcome the contradiction between religious legality and popular reality, Arabic literature resorted to a curious hadith attributed to Muhammad himself: "He who loves and remains chaste and hides his secret and dies, dies a martyr's death". The poet, apprehender of beauty, was impelled to sing of masculine beauty. The sublimation of courtly love through Neoplatonism, of singing bodily beauty transcended into ideal Beauty, allowed the poet to express his homoerotic feelings without danger of moral censure.

Homosexual love (مذكرات mudhakkarat) as a literary theme occurred in the realm of poetry throughout the Arab world; the Persian jurist and litterateur Muhammad ibn Dawud (868 - 909) wrote, at the age of 16, the Book of the Flower, an anthology of the stereotypes of the love lyric that devotes ample space to homoerotic verses; Emilio García Gómez points out that Ibn Dawud's anguish, due to the homoerotic passion he felt all his life towards one of his schoolmates (to whom he dedicated the book), was a spring that led him to realize a platonism that García Gómez identifies as a "collective yearning" in Arab culture to redirect a "noble spiritual flow" that found no way out. Ibn Dawud clothed it with the Arab myth of "udri love", whose name comes from the tribe of the Banu Udra, which would literally mean "Sons of Virginity": a refined idealism created by Eastern rhetoricians, an "ambiguous chastity", according to García Gómez, which was "a morbid perpetuation of desire".

Both the punitive and sentimental traditions figure in Andalusian literature, and notably in the writings of its best known love theorist, Abu Muhammad 'Ali ibn Ahmad ibn Sa'id ibn Hazm (994-1064), better known as Ibn Hazm, who says of love in The Ring of the Dove:

For Ibn Hazm, love escapes man's control, "it is a kind of nature, and man has power only over the free movements of his organs." In The Ring of the Dove, a mixture of theoretical generalizations and personal exemplifications or anecdotes (though the vast majority concern heterosexual love, especially for beautiful female slaves), stories of men falling in love with other men are repeatedly interspersed. At times the attribution is obscure, since the text, referring neutrally to the loved one, may be dedicated to either a man or a woman:

From the Baghdadi influence of Ibn Dawud, the Andalusians learned the rules of the game of courtly love: the unavailability of the loved one because he or she belongs to another (not because of adultery, but because he or she was generally a slave of another owner); the spy, the favorable friend, the slanderer? are part of a series of pre-established figures that accompanied the lovers in their story.Another poet who sang of the illicit pleasures of wine and ephebes was Abū Nuwās al-Hasan Ibn Hāni' al-Hakamī, better known simply as Abu Nuwas (Ahvaz, Iran, 747 - Baghdad, 815). The homoerotic love he celebrated is similar to that described in ancient Greece: the adult poet assumes an active role opposite a young adolescent who submits. Interest in ephebes was fully compatible with interest in women; both shared a socially subordinate role, a fact that was emphasized in poetry by showing them as members of an inferior class, or slaves or captive Christians.

Just as the active role was not socially condemned, the adult who took a passive (bottom) role in the homosexual relationship was the object of scorn. Thus, the age difference between lover and beloved was crucial in a homosexual relationship; hence the appearance of facial hair on the ephebe was an extremely popular topos in Arab homoerotic poetry, because it marked the transition to an untenable situation, although it immediately generated a response in defense of the beauty maintained in a fully bearded young man.

Strophes and genres of classical Arabic poetry 

Classical Arabic poetry used three basic types of verses or strophic forms: the qasida, a long, monorhymic ode; the qita or quita, a short, monorhymic fragment or poem on a single theme or image; and the muwassah or moaxaja, a strophic form that appeared later. The latter two were usually devoted to matters related to the pleasures of life, descriptions of wine and its consumption, love or expressions of regret for the ephemerality of such pleasures.

The qasida was the usual form for the major genres: the panegyric or madih, in honor or praise of a great man; the elegiac, ritza or martiyya, commemorating the death of a great man; and the satirical genre, hiya or hicha, in which the enemy is ridiculed. The erotic genre qasida was known as nasib, and was closely linked with ogniya, verses adapted to song and musical accompaniment, cultivated by numerous female poets. All these genres can be considered, to a certain extent, variants impregnated with the assifat or descriptive genre, due to the exuberant luxury of images and nuances that Andalusian poetry displayed.

Two genres or themes in which homoerotic poetry can be found are the jamriyyat or khamriyyat (bacchic poetry) and the erotic-amorous genre, the ghazal or gazal, which depending on the sex of the object of desire can be known as mu'annathat, if dedicated to a woman, or mudhakkarat, if addressed to young men. A vast majority of this type of poetry refers to the cupbearer, combining the Bacchic and erotic themes.

9th and 10th centuries, Umayyad period 
Erotic poetry began to flourish in al-Andalus under the rule of Abderraman II (792-852) in the then Emirate of Córdoba. His grandson, Abd Allah I (844-912), already wrote amorous verses for a "dark-eyed gazelle", according to Ibn Hazm. The ambiguity in grammatical usages extended to the images used to describe the beauty of both ephebes and maidens, making it difficult to know the sex of the lover described. There were, however, some clues, which are sometimes masked in the translations: some terms that in Spanish are feminine words, such as "gazelle" and "moon", in Arabic are masculine. Another indication was the allusion to the facial hair, the bozo, which appears on the face of the ephebus both diminishing his beauty and increasing his attractiveness by evidencing his masculinity:

Ibn Abd Rabbihi (Córdoba, 860-940), poet of the courts of Abd Allah I and Abderramán III and one of the earliest representatives of Andalusian literature, wrote about a young man in the typical mood of submission to the beloved.

Another of the themes of Arabic poetry was the bacchic poetry (خمريات jamriyyat), celebrating, despite religious prohibitions, wine and drunkenness; it was sometimes mixed with homoeroticism in the figure of the cupbearer or pourer. Thus, some poets were more explicit and less chaste in the expression of their passion, as Ali ibn Abi l-Husayn (m. 1038):

It was relatively frequent in Arabic love poetry that the object of desire was a slave or captive. It was not uncommon for them to be blond people; Ibn Hazm himself noted that several caliphs were inclined towards the blond color, even that many of them, by maternal inheritance and given this family preference, were blond and blue-eyed. Yusuf ibn Harun ar-Ramadi (926-1013) wrote about a blond slave:

In another poem, Ar-Ramadi gave proof of his bisexuality by recounting a night of passion with an ephebe and a slave girl: "I stretched out my hand towards the peacock at times and at others I withdrew towards the wood pigeon." Ar-Ramadi, panegyrist of Almanzor and one of the most prominent Cordovan poets of the 10th century, became so enamored of a young Christian that he made the sign of the cross when he drank wine. When his turbulent political career led him to prison, he fell in love with a black slave: "I looked into his eyes and they made me drunk.... I am his slave, and he is my master." This submission and reversal of social roles in Arabic poetry resembles the chivalric romanticism of medieval Christian Europe.

Mention should also be made of Muḥammad ibn Hānī ibn Saˁdūn (c. Seville, 927 - 972) who stood out in the Caliphate of Córdoba for the boldness of his lyric poetry. In his poetry, which combined the classical currents of Bedouin tradition with modernist renovations, he practiced the genre of self-praise or boasting (fajr), displaying both his homosexuality and his ascription to Shiism, a faction of Islam persecuted in his time by the Umayyads.

11th century, the splendor of classical Arabic poetry 
The fall of the Umayyad Caliphate and the subsequent fragmentation into the Taifa kingdoms produced an exodus of poets to the various courts that were formed, decentralizing culture throughout al-Andalus. As the number of courts grew, so did the number of poets, and the possibility of the emergence of good creators.

Córdoba 

In Córdoba the figure of the extraordinary poet and philologist Abū 'Āmir ibn Šuhayd (992-1035), son of a minister of Almanzor, stood out. Ibn Suhayd presented himself as a cynical and libertine character, which he himself was responsible for disseminating and which may remind one of Lord Byron. He cultivated the modernist genres, which sang of the pleasures of life: love, wine, hunting, the pleasurable feeling of nature, because they reflected his way of life, his evident bacchic and bisexual activity, his attitude against the established. In one of his poems, after describing a party with young women in bloom, a royal pageboy appears, an adolescent and effeminate ephebus:

The most acclaimed lyricist of this period is the Cordovan Muhammad ibn Abd al-Malik ibn Quzman, or Ibn Quzman (c. 1080-1160), considered one of the great medieval poets. Tall, blond and blue-eyed, Ibn Quzman was an irreverent bohemian who led and displayed a licentious life. His figure recalls that of the Baghdadi Abu Nuwas at the court of Harun al-Rashid, also completely liberal in his homoeroticism.

Far from the qasidas and the canons of classical Arabic verse, Ibn Quzman brought to its highest level the zajal, a type of muwashshah or poetry in stanzas that was written in Hispanic dialectal Arabic. In a deliberately popular style and profuse in erotic situations, his zéjels celebrated wine, feasting, and love for women and young girls. Ibn Quzman liked the pleasures of life and to be always well dressed, but he hated to work:

When someone reminded him that whoever is serious in this life will be rewarded with Paradise, the irreverent Ibn Quzman replied to be in Paradise in this life, vindicating his libertine lifestyle:

Stricken by poverty at the end of his days, and imprisoned repeatedly accused of heresy for his attitude of defiance to the religious authorities, Ibn Quzman ended his days dedicated to teaching in a mosque. His work is collected in the translation made by Emilio García Gómez of his complete work, Todo Ben Quzman (Gredos, 1972).

Seville 
Seville became an independent kingdom, a taifa, under the sovereignty of the Banu 'Abbad, a rich and aristocratic provincial family that ruled with intelligence, lack of scruples, ambition, courage, pride and a high aesthetic sensibility, and that led Seville to be the poetic capital of the Al-Andalus of the Taifa kingdoms. Sevillian poetry acquired a new degree of exquisiteness and formal beauty in the reign of Abbad ibn Muhammad al-Mu'tadid (Seville, ? - id., 1069), King taifa of Seville (1042-1069). One of the best poets of his court, in which the ministers were poets and the poets were ministers, was his own son Muhammad ibn 'Abbad al-Mu'tamid (1040 - 1095). From a very young age he was united by an "equivocal and passionate friendship" with another of the great poets of the time, Abu Bakr ibn Ammar (1031-1086), also known as Ibn Ammar or Abenamar, of whom he was a disciple in Silves. Banished by Al-Mutadid to Zaragoza to avoid the pernicious influence on his son, Ibn Ammar wrote a qasida to the king asking for forgiveness, but perhaps the mention of his amusements and his youthful nights with Al-Mutamid in Silves caused the qasida to have no effect:

Despite complaining about his fate in Zaragoza, Ibn Ammar was able to dedicate his ghazal, a genre he mastered, to the beautiful ephebes of the court of Ibn Hud al-Mutaman. Upon the death of Al-Mutadid, the new king Al-Mutamid had his former friend and lover brought back, and together they ruled Seville, as king and minister. At the end of their lives their relationship was twisted by a confrontation of Ibn Ammar, then governor of Murcia, with the king of Valencia; Al-Mutamid wrote a satirical qasida, in which he ridiculed Ibn Ammar's humble origins. In the qasida with which the poet answered him, he mocked the Abbadids, Al-Mutamid's wife and children, and accused him of sodomy, recalling the days of Silves:

When Al-Mutamid was later able to apprehend Ibn Ammar, he pardoned him, but when he learned that the latter was boasting of his pardon, he flew into a rage and killed him with his own hands. After which, however, he mourned him and offered a sumptuous funeral.

Levante 
The former officials of the caliphate took over the provinces of the Levante of the Iberian Peninsula, the Sarq al-Ándalus, which with the arrival of the Cordovan elites had a great urban and cultural development. Ibn Jafaya of Alcira (1058-1139) can be considered one of the best modernist poets of al-Andalus. He stood out especially for the development of the modernist theme of the garden (rawdyyāt), to the point that the lyric on nature was called in al-Ándalus, in reference to his surname, jafayyi style. In his poetry he made subtle chaining of images, loaded with connotations to other themes, including homoeroticism; in a rawdiyyat, the description of a garden introduces a smile, an army, the wine in his cup which is a horse and ends in a beautiful young man. Indicative is the use of the term "moon" (of masculine gender in Arabic) to refer to the young man:

12th and 13th centuries. Almohad period. 
The invasion of Al-Andalus by the Almohads (al-Muwahhidūn, "those who recognize the unity of God"), coming from Morocco, provoked the emergence of new literary courts in the 12th and 13th centuries. Along with the emergence of female poets, due to greater female autonomy (perhaps because of an ancient matriarchal tradition) in this North African ethnic group, there was a flourishing of mystical poetry, in which the words of earthly love changed their scope to express the soul's transit to the love of God.

This did not mean the abandonment of love poetry, where homoeroticism continued to be present in a new preciosist form. Emilio García Gómez points out that the metaphors, worn out by use, were lexicalized to later generate new metaphors that could be called "second power" metaphors. Describing an ephebe, in verses that combine the lexicalized comparison of curly water as a coat of mail and the reddish color of oranges, Safwan ibn Idris of Murcia (1165-1202) wrote:

Also noteworthy is the famed Muhammad Ibn Galib, known as al-Rusafi (d. 1177), born in al-Rusafa (present-day Ruzafa, in Valencia) but settled in Málaga. Within the same preciosist phenomenon, al-Rusafi, transposing the theme of the beauty of the ephebos to the description of the artisans, and inverting the lexicalized metaphor of the slenderness of the waist like a branch, said in a poem:

At the court of Sa'īd ibn Hakam of Menorca a small literary court of Andalusian exiles from the peninsula was also formed, where poets continued this preciosity. One of his guests was Ibn Sahl of Seville (1212-1251). Born Jew, Ibn Sahl became a Muslim, an experience he described through homoerotic poems; thus, loving an ephebe named Musa (Moses), he abandons him for another named Muhammad. One of the poems dedicated to her first lover is a sample of the preciousness of the time and the images of "second power", where the sideburns resemble the legs of scorpions and the eyes resemble arrows or swords:

Homoerotic poetry by women 
Although the situation of Andalusian women was one of seclusion behind the veil and the harem, there were some among the upper classes who, being only daughters or without male siblings, were liberated by remaining single. The arrival of the Almohads in the 12th century also imported a tradition of matriarchal line that granted some freedom to women, favoring their access to education and literary production.

Another sector that could access the gatherings where poetry was created were the non-concubine slaves, freed from the veil and the harem. They were also freer in love: because the Arabs considered it necessary for the beloved to have the freedom to bestow his love, slaves of both sexes assumed, both in literature and in the real world, the role of masters of their lovers, one of the clichés of Arab courtly love. Those most associated with the literary environment were the female singers (qiyan), who received a careful education to satisfy both physically and aesthetically the man. The most prized talent being musical, the female singers learned hundreds of verses and were able to improvise their own compositions.

The love described by the poetesses is the cliché of Arab courtly love; in contrast to homoerotic poetry, the beloved is not described physically, with a few exceptions. In many cases their work comes as an echo of the male voice and point of view, and they come to sing the female beauty of others, simulating a sapphic love that some authors doubt that it had a parallel in real life, as is the case of the sisters Banat Ziyad of Guadix, Hamda and Zaynab, to whom the authors indistinctly attribute the authorship of the poems preserved under their surname. In one of their poems, the passion of one of the sisters for a young girl is expressed, leaving the doubt as to whether it is really homoeroticism or a mere literary cliché:

It is worth mentioning the figure of Princess Wallada bint al-Mustakfi (994 - 1077 or 1091), who has been called "the Andalusian Sappho". Daughter of the Caliph of Córdoba Muhammad III, the death of her father in 1025 left her a fortune in inheritance that allowed her to turn her home into a place of passage for writers. She had a scandalous relationship with the poet Ibn Zaidun, in whose anthologies her few poems that have come down to us are usually collected. According to the chronicles, Princess Wallada fell in love with Muhya bint al-Tayyani, daughter of a Cordovan fig seller, and took care of her education until she became a poetess. A lesbian relationship between them is supposed, but there is no evidence of it.

Translations and anthologies 
Although love poems dedicated to young men are numerous in Andalusian literature, Andalusian homoeroticism has been a scarcely studied subject, and the loss of materials (especially from the Nasrid period) was enormous, due to the blind destruction at the hands of the conquering Christians, such as the great burning of manuscripts ordered by Cardinal Cisneros. Christians exaggerated the extent of Andalusian debauchery, especially homosexual practices; they considered it a disease, superficially very attractive, but not only contagious, but incurable. Although in the 14th century the Nasrid Kingdom of Granada posed no threat to Castile, there was an exaggerated fear of invasions from the south. This attitude lasted until the contemporary age; according to Claudio Sánchez-Albornoz, "without the Reconquest, homosexuality, so practiced in Moorish Spain, would have triumphed".

Daniel Eisenberg mentions the presence of a small anthology "in the chapter "Perversión" of Claudio Sánchez-Albornoz's homophobic book, De la Andalucía islámica a la de hoy (1983)"; he also highlights Emilio García Gómez's Poemas arabigoandaluces, published at a time of liberalization in the late 1920s, as the first collection to reach general attention; as well as his translation of the complete works of Ibn Quzman, Todo Ben Quzman (Gredos, 1972); and a third collection translated by García Gómez, El libro de las banderas de los campeones.

The Real Biblioteca de San Lorenzo de El Escorial also contains homoerotic texts in Arabic: El abandono del pudor y el primer bozo de la mejilla; Excusas sobre el amor del primer bozo en la mejilla; and El jardín del letrado y las delicias del hombre inteligente.

See also 

 LGBT in Islam
 Homoerotic poetry
 Arabic poetry

References

Erotic poetry
LGBT poetry
Arabic erotic literature
Literature of Al-Andalus